Maerua crassifolia is a species of plant in the Capparaceae family. It is native to Africa, tropical Arabia, and Israel, but is disappearing from Egypt. Foliage from this plant is used as fodder for animals, especially camels, during the dry season in parts of Africa.

The plant grows commonly in Yemen, where it is called Meru. In the 18th century the plant's Arabic name Meru was used as the source for the genus name Maerua. The 18th-century taxonomist was Peter Forsskål, who visited Yemen in the 1760s.

It is used as a common nutrition source in central Africa, where it is called jiga and made into soups and other dishes. It was part of the daily diet of the Kel Ewey tribe of the tuaregs in the Aïr Mountains as late as in the 1980s, who would mix the cooked leaves with goat milk. Maerua crassifolia was considered sacred to the ancient Egyptians.

Distribution
Maerua crassifolia has been found growing along the Tsauchab river in Namibia at the following geo coordinates: 24°38'42.6"S 15°39'06.9"E.

References

Cook, J.A. et al. (1998).  Nutrient content of two indigenous plant foods of the Western Sahel: Balanites aegyptiaca and Maerua crassifolia. Journal of Food Composition and Analysis 11:3 221–30.

External links
Botanical Information
Niger Famine
 Egyptian Myths

crassifolia
Flora of Africa
Flora of North Africa
Flora of Western Asia
Flora of Morocco
Flora of Israel
Flora of Palestine (region)
Flora of Yemen
Flora of Niger
Flora of Egypt
Crops originating from Africa
Edible plants
Taxa named by Peter Forsskål